Spilsbury may refer to:

Albert Spilsbury (1894–1959), English footballer
Benjamin Spilsbury (1864–1938), English footballer
Sir Bernard Spilsbury (1877–1947), British pathologist
John Spilsbury (Baptist minister) (1593–), English cobbler and Particular Baptist minister
John Spilsbury (cartographer) (1739–1769), British mapmaker and engraver who invented the jigsaw puzzle
John Spilsbury (cricketer) (born 1933), English cricketer
Jonathan Spilsbury (–1812), English engraver
Klinton Spilsbury (born 1951), American actor
Maria Spilsbury (1776–1820), British artist
Thomas Spilsbury (1874–1947), English footballer
Tom Spilsbury (born 1976), British writer, magazine editor and journalist